The 2020 season for the  cycling team began in January at the Tour Down Under.

Team roster

Riders who joined the team for the 2020 season

Riders who left the team during or after the 2019 season

Season victories

National, Continental and World champions

Footnotes

References

External links

 
 

2020 road cycling season by team
Lotto–Soudal
2020 in Belgian sport